Dina Willemina Jacoba "Nida" Senff (3 April 1920 – 27 June 1995) was a backstroke swimmer from the Netherlands who won the 100 metres backstroke at the 1936 Summer Olympics in Berlin. She did so after missing a turning point, went back to push the wall, and still won the race. Senff won the Dutch title in the 100 metres backstroke in 1935 and 1937, and set five world records in 100 m, 150 yd and 200 m backstroke in 1936–1937. In 1983, she was inducted to the International Swimming Hall of Fame.

See also
 List of members of the International Swimming Hall of Fame

References

1920 births
1995 deaths
Olympic swimmers of the Netherlands
Swimmers at the 1936 Summer Olympics
Olympic gold medalists for the Netherlands
Swimmers from Rotterdam
Medalists at the 1936 Summer Olympics
Dutch female backstroke swimmers
Olympic gold medalists in swimming
20th-century Dutch women
20th-century Dutch people